The 1932 Prussian coup d'état or  took place on 20 July 1932, when Reich President Paul von Hindenburg, at the request of Franz von Papen, then Reich Chancellor of Germany, replaced the legal government of the Free State of Prussia with von Papen as Reich Commissioner. A second decree the same day transferred executive power in Prussia to the Reich Minister of the Armed Forces Kurt von Schleicher and restricted fundamental rights.

Papen had two rationales for the coup. One was that the 1932 Prussian state election had left a divided parliament with no viable possibilities for a coalition. This led to a caretaker government under the coalition that had held power before the election, with no clear path to replacing it with a new governing coalition. The second and major rationale was that in parts of Prussia there were violent street demonstrations and clashes taking place that Papen said the caretaker government could not control.

The coup had the effect of weakening the federalist Constitution of the Weimar Republic and facilitating the centralization of the Reich under Adolf Hitler after he came to power in January 1933. The immediate result, however, was elimination of the last resistance in Prussia to Papen's attempt to establish a ‘New State’, essentially a precursor to a restored monarchy. Contrary to Papen's intent, the move ultimately had the effect of easing Hitler's path to power.

Historical context

Discussions about a reorganization of the Reich 
Since the late 1920s the relationship between the Reich and Prussia had been the subject of discussion by the League for the Renewal of the Reich, a group to which von Papen belonged. The aim of the circle, founded by Hans Luther and often called the Luther League, was to strengthen the Reich's central power, reorganize northern Germany, especially Prussia, which was by far the largest state in Germany, and create an authoritarian presidential regime. The program included having the Reich president, the Reich government and the Reichstag replace the Prussian government and parliament, and empowering the chancellor to appoint state commissioners. It was assumed that Prussia, contrary to the interest of the entire nation, was as a state pursuing hegemony within the existing national structure. A comprehensive segmentation and disempowerment was proposed.

In 1928 a conference of the states, consisting of members of the Reich cabinet and all of the state minister presidents, came to the joint resolution that the relationship between the Reich and the states in the Republic was unsatisfactory and in need of fundamental reform, and that a "strong Reich power" was necessary. A constitutional committee was appointed to draw up workable proposals for constitutional and administrative reform and for prudent financial management.

On 21 June 1930 the assessments were presented. The four main points as laid out by the architect of the reform plan Arnold Brecht, then Ministerial Director of the Prussian State Chancellery and later the main representative of the Prussian government in the lawsuit against the emergency decree, were as follows:

  unite the central administration of the Prussian state government with the central administration of the Reich government
  unite the central authorities of the Prussian state government with those of the Reich
  eliminate Prussia as a state
  place the thirteen Prussian provinces, including Berlin, under the direct control of the Reich government as new states

The reform effort faced objections primarily from Bavaria and Prussia. Bavaria, the second largest state, objected because it feared that the proposal would  immediately unify the northern German states while the south would gain only a reprieve from becoming part of a unified, non-federal Reich. 

Political developments made implementation of the program impossible, but, as the political scientist Everhard Holtmann wrote, "core elements of the reform package, such as the abolition of Prussia's statehood, were [...] henceforth employed in a targeted manner in the domestic power struggle."

Papen's idea of a 'New State' 

Papen's initiative for the Prussian coup is to be understood within the context of the plan for the establishment of a ‘New State’, a concept propagated above all by Walther Schotte – a journalist and historian who provided Papen with ideas and theories – and Edgar Jung, a lawyer and anti-democratic journalist. They did not favor the National Socialists but rather wanted to create the precursor to a monarchy, an authoritarian presidential regime with a chancellor dependent on the confidence of the president and a parliament severely limited in its rights, similar to the government under the constitution of the German Empire. Papen's long-term goal was to restore the Hohenzollern monarchy. The ‘New State’ was to stand above particularist interests and provide the necessary security, order, and tranquility for economic development.

Situation in Prussia after the state elections of 24 April 1932 
The Free State of Prussia had been governed since 1920 by a stable coalition of the Social Democratic Party of Germany (SPD) , the Catholic Centre Party and the German Democratic Party (DDP). In the 1932 Prussian state election of April 24, the Nazi Party (NSDAP) won 162 seats and the Communist Party of Germany (KPD) 57, a total of 219 out of 423, or 52%. All other parties together won only 204 seats, or 48%. The NSDAP and KPD would not work together, and none of the other parties could form a government with a parliamentary majority without the support of one of the anti-democratic parties, something that none of them was willing to accept. That meant that after the formal resignation of the previous state government – the third cabinet of Otto Braun – it remained in office on a caretaker basis in accordance with Article 59 of the state constitution. With parliamentary rules having recently been changed to require an absolute majority for the election of a minister president, it was possible that the caretaker government could continue on indefinitely. The situation was similar to that in Bavaria, Saxony, Hesse, Württemberg and Hamburg, although the Reich government did not concern itself with them.

Papen's and Hindenburg's approach 
A center-right government in Prussia consisting of the NSDAP (162 seats) and the Centre Party (67 seats) with a 53% majority was technically possible. Together with the 31 seats of the nationalist-conservative German National People's Party (DNVP), this coalition would have had as many as 260 of 423 seats. Reich Chancellor von Papen sought such a coalition, but the NSDAP claimed power for itself alone. On 7 June 1932, Papen, although not formally authorized to do so, asked Hanns Kerrl, president of the state parliament and a member of the NSDAP, to replace the caretaker Prussian government with an elected one, something Kerrl was unable to guarantee due to the failure of coalition negotiations to that point.

As a result, Papen considered other possibilities. The first was to carry out the long-debated Reich reform which would have dissolved or divided Prussia. Because this path would have achieved its goal only in the long term, was difficult to accomplish and highly controversial, he favored another option. He planned to appoint a Reich commissioner in place of the previous government and to enforce the new order, if necessary with the help of the Reichswehr.

For this he had certain precedents. Reich President Friedrich Ebert of the SPD had issued a Reich execution – an intervention against an individual state led by the central government to enforce national law – during 1923's German October. In the face of democratically elected left-wing governments in Saxony and Thuringia that included the Communist Party of Germany, the forcible removal of the governments had been justified by the fact that peace and order were endangered in the two states. There had also been concern about an attempt at a communist revolution – one that was in fact ordered by the Comintern in Moscow. After the government of Saxony refused to disarm illegally established workers' militias, a Reich execution had been imposed and carried out. Only in Hamburg had the Comintern's order for revolution been fulfilled to any extent. There a minor communist uprising that involved fatalities took place, but it was put down by the police.

Papen found an analogous justification for Prussia in the clashes culminating in the Altona Bloody Sunday of 17 July 1932. It involved on one side the Nazi SA, which had just had the ban against it lifted by the Papen government, and on the other the Communists and Social Democrats. The deadly confrontations and ensuing police action differed markedly from the Reich execution against Saxony in 1923. Then there had indeed been doubts about the loyalty of Saxony's left-wing government to the constitution and its willingness to take police action, but there was no question of this in Prussia's case.

Three days earlier, on July 14, Reich President Paul von Hindenburg had signed an undated emergency decree pursuant to Article 48 of the Weimar Constitution at the request of Papen, who had visited him at his home in Neudeck along with Interior Minister Wilhelm von Gayl. By means of the decree Hindenburg authorized the Reich Chancellor to become Reich Commissioner for Prussia and enabled him to remove the caretaker Prussian government from office. By not dating the decree, Hindenburg left to Papen the choice of the time at which to make use of the power. Papen chose July 20.

The third option, which would have consisted of waiting and leaving Prussia's caretaker minority government in office and trusting that it would get the situation under control even without a parliamentary majority, was one that Papen from the outset did not consider.

Course of the coup 

On 20 July 1932 Prussia's Deputy Minister President Heinrich Hirtsiefer, in place of the acting but ill Minister President Otto Braun, along with Interior Minister Carl Severing and his colleague from the finance department Otto Klepper, went to see Papen at his request. Papen informed the constitutional ministers about the Hindenburg decree that allowed him to be installed as Reich commissioner and for the caretaker government to be removed. He said that the step was necessary because it appeared that "public safety and order in Prussia could no longer be guaranteed". A state of emergency was declared with immediate effect, and the Reichswehr was given the power to enforce the decree. Prussia's representatives objected to the coup saying that Prussia had not violated any of its responsibilities under the Reich constitution and its laws, and had done as much for security as the other states even though its jurisdiction included the areas of greatest unrest. The Braun government therefore challenged the constitutionality of the emergency decree. Severing responded negatively to Papen's suggestion that he voluntarily relinquish his official duties, saying that he would "yield only to force". 

Otto Klepper reported a year later in an essay in the exile newspaper The New Journal that he had hoped that Severing would resist after he made his declaration, especially since both Papen and Interior Minister von Gayl, who was also present, had seemed very uncertain. "I suggested that we recess the meeting with Papen for an hour to discuss further action by the Prussian government and went to the door. But Severing declared that he had nothing more to discuss with me, and remained seated. Only then – after it was certain that no resistance was in the offing – was Secretary of State Planck given the order to set the command to the Reichswehr in motion."

In the afternoon of the same day, Severing, who commanded a force of 90,000 Prussian police officers, let himself be led out of his office and ministry by a delegation consisting of the police chief whom Papen had just appointed and two police officers. At 11:30 a.m. Papen had imposed a military state of emergency under the Reichswehr – a national force of 100,000 men – and, after the Prussian government backed down, occupied the Prussian Interior Ministry, the Berlin police headquarters and the headquarters of the Schutzpolizei (protective police).

The Berlin police chief Albert Grzesinski, his deputy Bernhard Weiß, and the commander of the protective police, the centrist politician Magnus Heimannsberg, were taken into custody and released the next day, after they had bound themselves in writing to engage in no more official acts. Immediately after the dismissal of the state government, a large-scale purge began. Numerous officials who had belonged to the previous coalition parties, especially the SPD, were put on temporary retirement and replaced by conservative officials, the majority of them German nationalists. This step, in addition to affecting the cabinet of Otto Braun, was directed especially against Social Democratic provincial presidents and leading Social Democrats within police organizations. Following a decree issued on 12 November 1932, those who had been placed on retirement were either dismissed or delegated to the provinces. In this way 69 ministerial officials with republican sentiments were sidelined. In addition to members of the Braun cabinet, they included among others Carl Steinhoff, vice-president of the province of East Prussia, and Carl Freter, district administrator of Calau in Brandenburg. But this was only the first step.

The purge continued well into 1933. With targeted interventions against the police, especially the political police, an essential part of the power apparatus in Prussia had already been "cleansed" before Adolf Hitler's chancellorship. There was hardly any resistance, mainly because the SPD's executive board had decided on July 16 not to resist with the resources available to it in order to avoid provoking a civil war.

Members of the first commissioner's government 

 Interior Ministry and Franz von Papen's Deputy Reich Commissioner and Deputy Reich Chancellor: Franz Bracht, former Lord Mayor of Essen
 Commerce: Friedrich Ernst, Reich Commissioner for Banking Supervision in Heinrich Brüning's cabinet
 Finance: Franz Schleusener, State Secretary in the Prussian Ministry of Finance
 Justice: Heinrich Hölscher, State Secretary in the Prussian Ministry of Justice
 Culture: Aloys Lammers, State Secretary in the Prussian Ministry of Science, Art and Education
 Agriculture: Fritz Mussehl, Ministerial Director in the Prussian Ministry of Agriculture
 Public Welfare: Adolf Scheidt, Ministerial Director in the Prussian Ministry of Welfare

Reaction of the Prussian state government 
Despite its previous declarations, the Prussian government refused to respond with violence of its own to the violence that the national emergency and emergency decree had officially sanctioned. Deployment of the Prussian police and the Reichsbanner Schwarz-Rot-Gold – an organization formed by three center and left of center parties to defend parliamentary democracy – was rejected. Even non-violent resistance in the form of a general strike was not considered because it did not seem feasible in view of the high unemployment during the Great Depression. There was also little prospect of success in a call for civil disobedience by civil servants. If open resistance were to occur, the government anticipated the outbreak of civil war, especially in the event of an armed clash between the Reichswehr and the state police, which it wanted to avoid at all costs. Moreover, legal recourse had not yet been exhausted.

On 21 July 1932 the Prussian government filed an application for a temporary injunction and a constitutional complaint with the State Court of the Reich Supreme Court. It was represented by Ministerial Director Arnold Brecht. The application for a temporary injunction was rejected on 25 July 1932 because the court did not want to anticipate its final decision.

Joseph Goebbels noted in his diary on July 21: "The Reds have missed their great hour. It will never come again."

Decision of the state court of 25 October 1932 
In its October 25 ruling on the Prussia versus Reich case, the State Court called the measures that Reich Commissioner von Papen took to maintain order and security under the state emergency partially legal, but ruled that the Braun government was to retain its status under state law in its relationship to the state parliament, the Reichstag, the Reichsrat and the Reich government. Its dismissal was ruled not justified.

In the interim, however, Papen's provisional government had already replaced Prussia's top administrative and police officials.

After the decision of the Reich Court, the Braun government, rehabilitated in terms of state law but deprived of its real power, reconvened for its weekly cabinet meetings as a so-called "sovereign government". The real power, however, lay with the representatives of the Reich execution – the "Commissar Government" under Franz Bracht. The Reich government ignored the provisions of the Reich Court's ruling, and the temporary operation of the commissarial administration was never terminated.

Political scientist and historian Karl Dietrich Bracher assessed the compromising verdict as one of "grotesque ambivalence", since its legal section upheld the Prussian point of view, "while its basic political tenor, with its acquiescence to what had already happened, accommodated the coup-like whim of a government that was propped up only by the authority of the Reich President and the power of the Reichswehr."

Carl Schmitt, who had represented Papen in the trial along with Erwin Jacobi and Carl Bilfinger, later endorsed the legality of the coup in an expert opinion.

References

Sources 
Lexikon der deutschen Geschichte – Ploetz, Verlag Herder, Freiburg im Breisgau, Österreich 2001 

1932 in law
1932 in Germany
1930s in Prussia
Politics of the Weimar Republic
German words and phrases
1930s coups d'état and coup attempts
Politics of Free State of Prussia
July 1932 events
Conflicts in 1932
Paul von Hindenburg
Franz von Papen